Clemens Thoma (November 2, 1932 – December 7, 2011) was a Swiss theologian.

He was professor of theology and Jewish studies and founder of the Institute for Jewish-Christian Studies (IJCF) at the University of Lucerne.

He grew up as one of eleven children in a family in the Canton of St. Gallen. After theological studies at St. Augustin near Bonn and St. Gabriel in Vienna, he was ordained a priest. At the University of Vienna, he studied Judaism under Kurt Schubert.

As part of his research Thoma undertook a systematic approach to present Rabbinic parables to New Testament scholars, for comparative purposes. In 1994 Thoma received the Buber-Rosenzweig-Medal. Hayim Perelmuter stated that Thoma's work on the Rabbinic parables "adornes the world of scholarship".

Works

Books

as Editor

Notes

Sources
 German Wikipedia

2011 deaths
1932 births
New Testament scholars